Mutare West is a constituency of the National Assembly of the Parliament of Zimbabwe, located in Manicaland Province. Its current MP since the 2018 election is Teedzai Muchimwe of ZANU–PF.

Electoral history 
The candidate of the ZANU–PF was declared the winner in the March 2005 parliamentary election,  despite irregularities.  In the March 2008 parliamentary election, Movement for Democratic Change candidate Shuah Mudiwa very narrowly won the seat, receiving 7,597 votes against 7,577 votes for Chris Mushohwe, the Minister of Transport and Communications, according to official results. Mushowe despite losing the parliamentary seat he was elevated to the level of provincial Governor. An independent candidate, Gideon Chamuka, received 536 votes.

References

Mutare District
Parliamentary constituencies in Zimbabwe